Al Qurayyat is a town in the Madaba Governorate of western Jordan.

References

Populated places in Madaba Governorate